Glentana is an unincorporated village in Valley County, Montana, United States. The community had a post office until September 4, 2010; it still has its own ZIP code, 59240.

The Glentana post office opened in 1913 with William J. O’Connor as postmaster. During the summer of 1926, the whole town was moved nearer the Great Northern Railway’s branch line between Scobey and Opheim.

References

Unincorporated communities in Valley County, Montana
Unincorporated communities in Montana